Jade Helen Bailey (born 11 November 1995) is an English-born Jamaican professional footballer who plays as a defender and a midfielder. She is currently a free agent, having last played for Liverpool FC, and also represents the Jamaica women's national team. She previously played for Arsenal, Chelsea and Reading (on loan from Chelsea). She is a former England youth international. She was involved in the final stages of the 2012 Summer Olympics torch relay.

Early life
Bailey is the daughter of soccer coach Trevor Bailey, the founder of Interwood Junior Football Club. Bailey started playing football at age 6 for a Sunday league team, becoming the top goalscorer for Chapel End. She eventually became captain and the only female player of Waltham Forest Schools U11. But the team did not allow mixed-gender teams from age 11, so Bailey got a trial with Arsenal, was signed to Arsenal's U12s girls team, started training with Arsenal, and was spotted by England scouts.

Bailey says she admired footballers Ashley Cole and John Terry, then later Arsenal and England captain Faye White.

Club career
She was given a scholarship and a two-year professional contract by Arsenal Ladies football team. Bailey came off the bench during Arsenal's win in the 2013 FA Cup. Bailey started the 2014 FA Cup final and was part of the Arsenal side which won 2–0. In April 2015, Manchester City's England midfielder Jill Scott was shown the red card and banned for three matches for headbutting Bailey during a match.

Bailey transferred to Chelsea in 2016 and made 16 appearances in her first season, as a deep-lying midfielder and sometimes in central defence. She suffered an anterior cruciate ligament injury in April 2017, ruling her out of participation in the following season. In January 2019, Chelsea gave Bailey a one-year contract extension and sent her on loan to Reading to prove her fitness.

In July 2019 Bailey was transferred to Liverpool, who assigned her the number 8 shirt. She was released at the end of the 2021-22 season.

International career
Bailey made her debut for England's under-17s on 3 October 2010 against Turkey as a defender although she had been an unplayed substitute in the matches against Italy and Serbia earlier that year. She was chosen by kit manufacturer Umbro in 2010 as one of the next generation of England's footballing stars.

She was included in the England u20 for the 2014 FIFA U-20 Women's World Cup in Canada. In 2016 Bailey was selected by coach Marieanne Spacey for England's 'Next Gen' squad, which replaced the previous Under-23 set up, though still competing in U23-aged matches and competitions.

On May 6, 2021 Bailey was included in the Jamaica women's national football team for the friendlies against Nigeria and the United States. On 25 October 2021, she debuted for Jamaica.

Olympic Games
The Olympic organizers appealed for a talented young footballer to take part in the 2012 Summer Olympics torch relay. Bailey had been trained by the Bailey Elite Football Academy in Wadham Lodge, Walthamstow during her teens and Waltham Forest Council nominated her to the organizers. Her part in the relay was watched by an estimated global audience of one billion as she stood on the prow of the motorboat driven by David Beckham and held the Olympic torch that was ferried to Steve Redgrave during the 2012 Summer Olympics opening ceremony. She was interviewed by the BBC's children's news program Newsround about the event and pointed out that Beckham drove the boat for most of its journey but didn't get to park it.

Honours
FA Women's Cup
Winner (2): 2012–13 and 2013–2014

FA Women's ChampionshipWinner (1):''' 2021-22

References

External links

 Profile at Chelsea FC
 Jade Bailey  at The FA.com
 Jade Bailey at UEFA.com
 Jade Bailey at Twitter
 
 Umbro promotional picture "The New Fabric of England" – Bailey is fourth from left on back row
 Umbro promotional picture "The New Fabric of England:Jade Bailey"
 FA Girls' Youth Cup U17s Centre of Excellence Final, Stadium MK, May 6, 2012, Milton Keynes – Bailey shields the ball from Ayane of Chelsea
 Sky News photograph of Bailey and Beckham

1995 births
Living people
Citizens of Jamaica through descent
Jamaican women's footballers
Women's association football defenders
Jamaica women's international footballers
Footballers from Walthamstow
English women's footballers
Arsenal W.F.C. players
Chelsea F.C. Women players
Reading F.C. Women players
Liverpool F.C. Women players
Women's Super League players
England women's youth international footballers
England women's under-23 international footballers
English sportspeople of Jamaican descent